Association Club Sportive de Hayableh (en ), more commonly abbreviated as ACS Hayableh, is a Djiboutian football club based in the Hayableh district in  Djibouti City, the capital of the country. The club currently plays in the Djibouti Premier League.

References

Football clubs in Djibouti